You Are Empty is a first-person shooter video game by Ukrainian developers Mandel ArtPlains and Digital Spray Studios. It was published by 1C Company in 2006. Atari later released the game in English in 2007.

The game is set in an alternate-history Soviet Union. It begins with the protagonist waking up in a ruined hospital, and it soon becomes clear that the populace has been afflicted by mutation and madness. He then must battle to stay alive and unravel the mystery.

Gameplay
You Are Empty features basic first-person shooter gameplay. Players can acquire a variety of both melee weapons and firearms, mostly based on real-world weapons such as a Mauser C96 pistol or PPSh-41 sub-machine gun. The sole exception to realism is the large electric gun, the last weapon the player receives.

Synopsis

Setting
You Are Empty takes place in 1955 in an alternative Soviet Union, where Joseph Stalin still reigns. In an attempt to ensure the global victory of Communism, the government has constructed a massive psychic antenna to broadcast a reality-altering signal designed to transform the population of the Soviet Union into supermen. However, the experiment goes wrong, and most of the population is either killed or transformed into homicidal mutants.

The game's cutscenes flesh out the backstory by telling the life story of the master scientist responsible for the disaster. As a young boy, the scientist discovers that he has psychic powers that allow him to control other living beings. Becoming a scientific protégé, he develops plans for a massive psychic antenna that would amplify his power and broadcast it across the world, initiating a Great Transformation of humanity. The scientist also believes that he is a New Man, which is not directly stated in the cutscenes but rather hinted in them because during every cutscene the scientist must master his limits.

Plot
The game's protagonist is a mid-rank military officer who has an accident at his place of work. While he is unconscious, something happens and when he wakes up in a hospital he finds many homicidal mutants and the world in  ruin. He fights with many homicidal mutants and investigates. He rarely meets with other survivors and encounters many surviving soldiers of the Soviet Army that are hostile to him and attempt to bring him to the high-ranking officer who tells him about the backstory behind this calamity before committing suicide.

The information brings the protagonist to the massive psychic antenna facility to meet the master scientist who is wired to the massive mechanism. The scientist congratulates the officer for making this far and shows that the great transformation is not entirely failed as it creates a perfect self-sufficient man who is capable of fighting for himself. The scientist then reveals that he doesn't have much time left to live and tells the officer that he has two choices: stay and rule over the remnant of the world or use the antenna to rewind time to before the disaster happens and kill the scientist before taking the plan to the Soviet leadership. To save the world, he chooses to rewind time and shoots the scientist in the head, after that he is beaten down by Stalin's bodyguards. The world eventually goes on in real-life reality.

Development
You are Empty lacks any lighting or shader effects, and relies entirely on flat textures for the game's visuals. At E3 2006 the developers of You Are Empty gave GameSpot a private screening of the game. GameSpot expressed interest in the physics engine, saying that it might "have some unexpected consequences".

There is a graphic problem with the latest Nvidia drivers (resulting in a white checkerboard corruption in the game). Before a patch was released, the developer suggested the players install an older Nvidia driver that was included in the game to solve the problem.

Reception
The game received unfavorable reviews from critics. On the review aggregator GameRankings, the game had an average score of 40% based on 15 reviews. On Metacritic, the game had an average score of 34 out of 100, based on 14 reviews.

Brett Todd of GameSpot gave the game a rating of 1.5 out of 10, stating "It's hard to imagine how anybody could make the Stalin-era Soviet Union less appealing than it was in reality, but You Are Empty sure does the trick." Todd described the game as an "atrocity" and a "painful exercise in shooter stupidity." Todd opined the English translations from the original Russian are "awful", the game has a slow, boring pace, the monsters are "mostly ripped off from other games" (mentioning Doom, Painkiller, Serious Sam, Silent Hill, and Redneck Rampage), and the missions are "geared around hunts for keys and levers." Todd did say that "some of the music can be effectively creepy." Todd ended his review by saying, "the nihilistic name of the game is never explained. Now move on with your life and try to pretend that games like You Are Empty don't exist."

References

External links
Official website
Official website (Atari)

2006 video games
Alternate history video games
First-person shooters
Cold War video games
Lua (programming language)-scripted video games
Post-apocalyptic video games
Video games developed in Ukraine
Video games set in the Soviet Union
Video games set in Moscow
Video games set in the 1950s
Video games set in 1955
Windows-only games
Windows games
1C Company games
Single-player video games